Darke Lake Provincial Park is a provincial park in British Columbia, Canada located west of Okanagan Lake, southwest of the town of Peachland in that province's Okanagan region. In 1941 Howard Clark bought Fish Lake from Clyde Stewart. He was a hunting and fishing guide that ran the camp, as well as raised four children with his wife Hazel. The children were Betty, Roger, Dale & Audrey. In 1959  he sold it to Jake and Betty Enns.

Images

References

External links
BC Parks information page

Provincial parks of British Columbia
Provincial parks in the Okanagan
1968 establishments in British Columbia
Protected areas established in 1968